A list of Spanish-produced and co-produced feature films released in Spain in 1997.

Films

Box office 
The ten highest-grossing Spanish films in 1997, by domestic box office gross revenue, are as follows:

Informational notes

See also 
 12th Goya Awards

References

External links
 Spanish films of 1997 at the Internet Movie Database

1997
Spanish
Films